Real Club Deportivo Espanyol Voleibol is a Spanish women's volleyball club from Barcelona. It was founded as CPAR Cornellá, and was absorbed by RCD Espanyol in 1982 after it won its first double. It was one of the leading Spanish teams in the 1980s, winning five national leagues and six national cups between 1980 and 1992 and representing Spain in European Volleyball Confederation competitions. It was disbanded in 1993.

In March 2017, the Association of Supporters and Shareholders of RCD Espanyol boosted a project for recovering the sporting sections of the club, but this time without any economic link with the football team. The new multi-sports club was created with the name of Seccions Deportives Espanyol (Sporting sections Espanyol). Despite it was planned the volleyball section would start only playing in youth categories during the 2017–18 season, finally a women's senior team would compete in the regional Catalan third division.

Titles
 Superliga Femenina (3)
1985, 1988, 1991
 Copa de la Reina (5)
1984, 1985, 1986, 1990, 1992
 Supercopa de España (1)
1990

Notable players
  María del Risco

References

External links
Espanyol sporting sections website 

RCD Espanyol
Catalan volleyball clubs
Volleyball clubs established in 1982
Sports clubs disestablished in 1993
1982 establishments in Spain
Sports clubs in Barcelona